The Ottoman–Persian War of 1821–1823 was fought between the Ottoman Empire and Qajar Iran from 1821 to 1823.

Background
Tensions between the two empires had been rising due to the Ottoman Empire's harboring of rebellious tribesmen from the Iranian Azerbaijan Province. The issues concerning the Kurdish borderland tribes such as the Haydaran and Sipki tribes had complicated the relations between the two empires. For instance, Iran launched a military campaign against Dervish Pasha, the muhafiz of Van, when he refused to return the Sipki Kurdish who took refuge and settled in Archesh.

The Ottoman-Persian War that began in 1821 was also part of a series of wars between the two empires, which was attributed to the influences of foreign powers, particularly Great Britain and the Russian Empire. The Persians and the Ottomans were within their respective spheres of influence and were drawn to their rivalry. The Russian Empire was attempting to put pressure on the Ottoman Empire, which was then at war with the Greeks.

War

Crown Prince Abbas Mirza of Persia, at the instigation of the Russian Empire, invaded Western Armenia and the areas surrounding the Iranian province of Azerbaijan. On 10 September 1821, the Iranian forces marched out of Tabriz towards the border. On 16 September, Iranian forces crossed the border at Gürbulak and them stormed the Bayezid Fortress in November 1821, securing Persian supply routes. The governor of Baghdad's invasion of Persia is defeated by Mohammed Ali Mirza who then besieges Baghdad, his untimely death ends the siege. Meanwhile, Abbas Mirza marched into eastern Anatolia with 30,000 troops and met an Ottoman army of 50,000 at the Battle of Erzurum. Abbas Mirza scored a crushing defeat over the Ottomans despite being severely outnumbered and his army suffering from a cholera epidemic.

Result
Peace was not concluded until the Treaty of Erzurum two years later; both sides recognized the previous borders established by the Treaty of Zuhab in 1639, with no territorial changes. Also included in the treaty, was the guaranteed access for Persian pilgrims to the holy sites of Mecca and Medina within the Ottoman Empire.

Notes

References

Sources

Conflicts in 1821
Conflicts in 1822
Conflicts in 1823
Ottoman–Persian Wars
Wars involving Qajar Iran
1820s in the Ottoman Empire
1820s in Iran
History of Erzurum